Swapna Patker is a corporate trainer  and business woman  better known for 2015 Marathi film Balkadu, a biopic of Shivsena founder Balasaheb Thackeray. She is chief managing director of The Royal Maratha Entertainment, a film production company. Patker is author of Jeevan Funda, a Marathi language self-help book, published in 2013.

Swapna Patker as Corporate Trainer 
Swapna Patker is a corporate trainer, CBT and "wellness consultant" from Mumbai. She founded Mindworks Training Systems, a wellness clinic and online counseling, and training setup. Dr. Swapna Patker has expertise in children, adult and teenage counseling. She lays focus on emotion handling, addiction medicine and relationship counseling; and specializes in wellness training for children, parents and corporate. As a dream analyst, she guides you through interpretation of own dreams and their application to real life problems with the use of cognitive (CBT) and emotive (REBT) therapies. She runs a life coaching practice in India.

Swapna Patker as Writer 
Besides mind training, Swapna Patker is active in other creative areas also. She is an author of book 'Jivanfunda'. She did writing for 'Corporate India' a magazine covering the corporate every month through an eye lens of finance & industry growth. She even wrote Harvard Business review on 'India & Business'. She use to write columns named 'Corporate Mantra' & 'Athavdyacha Manus' in Dainik Samana.

Swapna Patker as Producer 
In 2015, Under the banner of The Royal Maratha Entertainment, Swapna Patker produced a Marathi language film Balkadu, which is biopic of late Balasaheb Thackeray. She also wrote lyrics for the film.

Swapna Patker as Hotelier 
As a woman entrepreneur, She founded Saffron 12, a multi-cuisine and fine-dining family restaurant in Mumbai. At the launch of Saffron 12, on 12 March 2013, Sanjay Dutt, Bappi Lahiri, Hrishitaa Bhatt, Mudasir Ali, Tajdar Amrohi, Suresh Wadkar and wife Padma, Dalip Tahil, Gary Richardson and Murli Sharma were among the guests spotted.

Personal life

On 8 June 2021 she was arrested in fake medical degree case by Bandra police in Mumbai. Patker alleged the arrest to be a "revenge arrest" because she had filed a case in which she alleged being stalked by particular individuals "allegedly at the behest of Shiv Sena Member of Parliament Sanjay Raut." Bombay high court granted bail to Patker on 27 June 2021.

References

External links

 
 

Indian psychiatrists
Indian women film producers
Film producers from Mumbai
Indian women screenwriters
Living people
Indian women film directors
Marathi people
Marathi film producers
English-language writers from India
Marathi-language writers
University of Mumbai alumni
Harvard Business School alumni
Indira Gandhi National Open University alumni
1982 births
Indian women medical doctors
20th-century Indian women writers
20th-century Indian dramatists and playwrights
Indian women social scientists
Screenwriters from Mumbai
Businesswomen from Maharashtra
21st-century Indian women writers